Mirza Bašić was the defending champion but chose not to participate.

Illya Marchenko won the title after defeating Ilya Ivashka 6–4, 6–4 in the final.

Seeds

Draw

Finals

Top half

Bottom half

References
Main Draw
Qualifying Draw

Guzzini Challenger - Singles
Guzzini Challenger